The 2A28 Grom is the main armament of the BMP-1 and BMD-1 infantry fighting vehicles. It is a 73 mm low pressure smoothbore semi-automatic gun with a wedge breech block. Development of the 2A28 Grom was directly linked to that of the SPG-9 recoilless gun; both fired projectiles similar to rocket-propelled grenades.

Development history
During the early 1960s, the Soviet Armed Forces issued a requirement for a new infantry transporter that was highly mobile, sufficiently armed to destroy comparable Western vehicles such as the M59 and the Schützenpanzer Lang HS.30, and allowed embarked infantrymen to fight from within its crew compartment. This concept evolved into the BMP-1.

The BMP was initially to be armed with a 23mm autocannon, a choice directly inspired by the success of the West German HS.30. However, the Soviet government had invested heavily in the development of anti-tank guided missile (ATGM) systems and discussion soon shifted to arming the BMP with missiles. This would allow it to defend itself against main battle tanks. The KB Priborostroyeniye design bureau in Tula soon proposed a specialized turret carrying both a low-velocity smoothbore gun and a mount for 9M14 Malyutka ATGMs. The purpose of the gun was to destroy tanks at closer ranges where the missiles were largely ineffective.

Description
The gun is relatively compact and weighs . In the BMP, the gun is brought to bear by an electric motor, with a manual mechanical backup. The maximum horizontal and vertical traverse speed with the electrical system is 20 °/s and 6 °/s respectively. Minimum horizontal and vertical direction rate is correspondingly 0.1 °/s and 0.07 °/s. The gun can be depressed and elevated between −4° and +33°, with aimed fire possible up to an elevation of +15°. The turret can traverse 360°. Cyclic rate of fire is between 8 and 10 rounds per minute, with the gun returning to an elevation of +3° 30' to reload after each shot if the autoloader is used.

It is fed from a forty-round mechanized conveyor double-row magazine located around the turret ring of the BMP-1. The gun is reloaded by the M3 electromechanical autoloader with ammunition conveyor, but can be reloaded by hand if necessary. The autoloader is not reliable; it can break down from vibration when the vehicle is moving at high speed over rough ground, and its operation is a danger to the gunner's fingers. With the autoloader, the gun has a rate of fire of 8 rounds per minute. These drawbacks caused the autoloader to be removed in Ob'yekt 765Sp3, Finnish BMP-1 and Swedish Pbv 501. Some units removed the autoloader altogether when new vehicles were delivered, but the mechanized ammunition conveyor magazine was retained.

Ammunition

The 2A28 'Grom' smoothbore gun fires the same projectiles as the SPG-9 infantry light recoilless gun, but with a smaller propellant charge. Before 1974, the ammunition only consisted of high explosive anti-tank (HEAT) rounds; the PG-15V HEAT fixed fin-stabilized rocket-assisted round. After 1974, OG-15V HE-Fragmentation projectiles were introduced. In the Ob'yekt 765Sp3, the standard ammunition load is 24 PG-15V HEAT rounds and 16 OG-15V HE-Frag rounds.

The PG-15V HEAT round weighs  and uses a  PG-9 shell with a  RDX explosive charge in the warhead.

The OG-15V HE-Frag round weighs , it uses an OG-9 shell with a  TNT bursting charge. The OG-15V is loaded by hand as it is too short to be handled by the autoloader.

2A28 Grom turret has a launcher for Malyutka and Malyutka-M ATGMs.

Performance
The HEAT warhead can penetrate  of steel armor—more than enough to penetrate the frontal armor of NATO main battle tanks (MBT)s of the 1970s, such as the US M60A1, the British Chieftain or the German Leopard 1.

A coaxial 7.62 mm PKT machine gun is mounted to the right of the main armament for which the BMP-1 carries 2,000 rounds in belts of 250. They are stowed in two boxes under the main gun. The machine gun has a rate of fire of around 800 rounds a minute.

The 2A28 "Grom" gun and PKT coaxial machine gun cannot be accurately fired while the vehicle is moving over rough ground. This means that the BMP-1's main armament is less capable than modern stabilised autocannons, which can be fired accurately while moving. The BMP-1 is unable to engage tanks and APCs using the 2A28 "Grom" gun from hull-down positions due to its limited depression, making it vulnerable to enemy fire. The limited elevation of the main gun, its lack of firepower and inaccuracy against point targets at  meant that it could not fight effectively in the mountains of Afghanistan.

Applications

In Soviet and Russian service, the only other armored fighting vehicle besides the BMP-1 known to have utilized the 2A28 Grom was the BMD-1. However, it is also mounted on the Chinese Type 86 (WZ-501) and the Iranian Boragh.

Both the Armed Forces of the Islamic Republic of Iran and the Cuban Revolutionary Armed Forces are known to possess a number of wheeled BTR-60PB armored personnel carriers retrofitted with the complete turret and main gun assembly of the BMP-1. There is a fire support variant of the WZ-551 in Chinese service equipped with the 2A28 Grom in a modified turret. The Namibian Army currently operates a variant of the WZ-523 and the Wer'wolf MKII APC mounting the BMP-1 turret.

See also
M242 Bushmaster
2A42
9M113 Konkurs
 BMP development
 BMP-1
 BMD-1
 SPG-9

Notes

References

External links
73mm-2A28-Grom-Gun-Manual 

Anti-tank weapons
Cold War artillery of the Soviet Union
Vehicle weapons
Military equipment introduced in the 1960s